

The LVG D.V was a prototype German biplane fighter built by LVG in World War I.

Design
The D.V was a single-seat biplane fighter which featured a slab-sided plywood-covered fuselage as well as equal span wings, both of which had straight leading edges and rounded tips, but the upp erwing chord was shorter, opposite to normal contemporary practice. The rudder was almond-shaped and carried on a tubular spar, with the entire vertical tail moving.

Development
The D.V made its first flight in the summer of 1918. Tests showed it be very fast yet hard to control; at the end of a test flight in July 1918, the D.V, piloted by its designer Paul Ehrhardt, crash-landed and was badly damaged.

Specifications

References

Bibliography

1910s German fighter aircraft
D 05
Rotary-engined aircraft
Biplanes
Aircraft first flown in 1918